Transferrin receptor 2 (TfR2) is a protein that in humans is encoded by the TFR2 gene. This protein is involved in the uptake of transferrin-bound iron into cells by endocytosis, although its role is minor compared to transferrin receptor 1.

Function
This gene is a member of the transferrin receptor-like family and encodes a single-pass type II membrane protein with a protease associated (PA) domain, an M28 peptidase domain and a transferrin receptor-like dimerization domain. This protein mediates cellular uptake of transferrin-bound iron and mutations in this gene have been associated with hereditary hemochromatosis type III. Alternatively spliced variants which encode different protein isoforms have been described; however, not all variants have been fully characterized.

See also
 Transferrin receptor 1
 Transferrin

References

Further reading

External links
  GeneReviews/NIH/NCBI/UW entry on TFR2-Related or Type 3 Hereditary Hemochromatosis

Iron metabolism
Transferrins